Andoni Lafuente Olaguibel (born September 6, 1985) is a Spanish professional road and track bicycle racer.

Palmarès 

2003
 U19 Points Race Champion
3rd, Pursuit
2009 Euskaltel - Euskadi
Winner Mountains Classification 2009 Tour Down Under

External links 
Profile at Euskaltel-Euskadi official website 

Cyclists from the Basque Country (autonomous community)
Spanish male cyclists
1985 births
Living people
People from Guernica
Sportspeople from Biscay